Virginia is a city in Cass County, Illinois, United States. The population was 1,514 at the 2020 census. It is the county seat of Cass County.

Geography

Demographics

As of the 2020 census there were 1,514 people, 593 households, and 379 families residing in the city. The racial makeup of the city was 91.94% White, 0.73% African American, 0.53% Native American, 0.26% Asian, 0.13% Pacific Islander, 1.39% from other races, and 5.02% from two or more races. Hispanic or Latino of any race were 4.43% of the population.

There were 593 households, out of which 55.31% had children under the age of 18 living with them, 41.82% were married couples living together, 11.47% had a female householder with no husband present, and 36.09% were non-families. 27.32% of all households were made up of individuals, and 11.30% had someone living alone who was 65 years of age or older. The average household size was 2.70 and the average family size was 2.26.

The city's age distribution consisted of 24.9% under the age of 18, 8.4% from 18 to 24, 22.2% from 25 to 44, 26.4% from 45 to 64, and 18.1% who were 65 years of age or older. The median age was 39.9 years. For every 100 females, there were 87.5 males. For every 100 females age 18 and over, there were 88.7 males.

The median income for a household in the city was $48,625, and the median income for a family was $52,125. Males had a median income of $36,250 versus $31,793 for females. The per capita income for the city was $26,824. About 19.8% of families and 18.4% of the population were below the poverty line, including 29.8% of those under age 18 and 4.7% of those age 65 or over.

School
Virginia, Illinois has one school: a K-12 facility run by Virginia Community Unit School District 64.  The facility is broken down into sections: Virginia Elementary School, Virginia Junior High School, and Virginia High School.

Events
The Virginia Bar-B-Que is an annual barbecue held during the first weekend of June.  It features live music, carnival rides, flea market, parades and barbecued food.

Notable people
 Craig J. Findley (born 1948), newspaper editor, photographer, and Illinois state representative
 Eric Jokisch - MLB pitcher
 John Linebaugh Knuppel (1923–1986), member of the Illinois Senate from 1971 until 1981.
 Arthur A. Leeper (1855–1931), lawyer and Illinois state senator
 Kyle MacWherter (1892–1977), American football player.
 Howard D. McKibben (born 1940), judge of the United States District Court for the District of Nevada from 1984 until 2005. McKibben was born in Virginia.

See also
 Jim Edgar Panther Creek State Fish and Wildlife Area — nearby state conservation area

References

External links
 City of Virginia website — official site
 Virginia, Illinois, Economic Development in Cass County — community calendar and directory site
 Virginia Bar-B-Que

Cities in Cass County, Illinois
Cities in Illinois
County seats in Illinois